The following highways are numbered 805:

Australia 
 (Multiple Roads)

Costa Rica
 National Route 805

United States
  Interstate 805
  Florida State Road 805 (former)
  Louisiana Highway 805
  Maryland Route 805
  Nevada State Route 805 (former proposal)
  Pennsylvania Route 805
  Farm to Market Road 805
  Virginia State Route 805 (Grayson County)
  Virginia State Route 805 (1928-1933) (former)

Territories
  Puerto Rico Highway 805